Dmitry Alekseyevich Shabanov (born 19 July 1964) is an Olympic sailor. He won the silver medal in the Soling class at the 1996 Summer Olympics.

References

External links
 
 
 

1964 births
Living people
Russian male sailors (sport)
Olympic sailors of Russia
Olympic silver medalists for Russia
Olympic medalists in sailing
Sailors at the 1996 Summer Olympics – Soling
Medalists at the 1996 Summer Olympics
Soling class world champions